Animals with Human Intelligence is the third studio album by the America rock band Enuff Z'nuff and is also their first and only album on Arista Records. Original drummer Vikki Foxx left Enuff Z'nuff right after the recording sessions ended, to join Vince Neil' band. In addition to the promotional video for the song "Right by Your Side," the band made a live appearance on the Late Night with David Letterman TV show, performing the song "Superstitious". The song "Innocence" was released as a follow-up single, though no video was made to promote it.

This record was not as successful as their prior releases in the US, but the band did find some success overseas. Singer Donnie Vie and bassist Chip Z'Nuff did a promotional tour of Japan, where the album peaked at No. 49 on the Oricon Charts. The Japanese issue of the album also included the exclusive track "Fingertips". The album was later re-issued in 2000 on Spitfire Records with new artwork and "Fingertips" now included.

In 1996, the song "Bring It On Home" was featured in the movie Jerry Maguire, starring Tom Cruise. However, the song only appears listed on the credits and was not in the actual film, since it was in a deleted scene. The song "Rock N World" was featured in the 2011 direct-to-video film Dahmer vs. Gacy.

The song "Right by Your Side" was covered by the Norwegian rock group The Tuesdays in 1994. The same song was also covered in 2009 on G.O.O.D. Morning, G.O.O.D. Night by Malik Yusef, a Kanye West collaboration album. Yusef's version of the song also features Destiny's Child singer Michelle Williams on backing vocals.

Track listing
All songs written by Donnie Vie and Chip Z'Nuff, except where noted.
"Superstitious" (Vie, Z'Nuff, Gino Martino) – 4:07
"Black Rain" – 3:48
"Right by Your Side" (Vie) – 4:22
"These Daze" – 3:51
"Master of Pain" – 4:25
"Innocence" (Vie) – 4:50
"One Step Closer to You" – 3:37
"Bring It On Home" – 3:55
"Takin' a Ride" – 4:11
"The Love Train" – 3:47
"Mary Anne Lost Her Baby" – 4:04
"Rock N World" – 3:21

Japanese and reissue editions bonus track
"Fingertips" – 3:50

Personnel
Enuff Z'nuff
Donnie Vie – lead vocals, guitar, piano, producer
Derek Frigo – lead guitar
Chip Z'Nuff – bass guitar, backing vocals, producer

Additional musicians
Vik Foxx – drums
Brian Ripp, Jon Negus, Leo Kawczinski, Mark Colby, Steve Eisen, Steve Zoloto – saxophones on tracks 1 and 5
Gary Fry – brass arrangements
John Armstrong, Phil Kaffel – keyboard programming on track 2
Kim Bullard – keyboard arrangements

Production
Richie Zito – producer
Phil Bonanno – producer on tracks 1, 2, 5, 8-12, engineer
Dave Mauragas – engineer, assistant producer and additional engineering on track 6
Lawrence Ethan, Bruce Breckenfeld – engineers
Brian Scheuble, Chad Munsey, Doug McBride, Ulrich Wild – assistant engineers
Nigel Green – mixing at Battery Studios, New York
Eric Gast – mixing assistant
George Marino – mastering at Sterling Sound, New York

Release history

References 

1993 albums
Arista Records albums
Enuff Z'nuff albums
Albums produced by Richie Zito
Albums recorded at A&M Studios